Big Brother Bitwa (Big Brother Battle) is the third season of the Polish reality television series Big Brother. The show followed a number of contestants, known as housemates, who are isolated from the outside world for an extended period of time in a custom-built house. Each week, one of the housemates is evicted by a public vote, with the last housemate remaining winning a cash prize. The show was launched on March 3, 2002 and concluded on May 26, 2002, last 85 days.

In 2002, a new format of the Big Brother show has been implemented in the Netherlands and Poland. Fourteen housemates are divided into two teams: red and blue. After a week, the two housemates who gained the most votes of viewers become captains. Teams fight with each other and play various competitions or battles. The winner of each battle has specific privileges, comforts and rewards. The winning team gains immunity from nominations and benefits from a whole system of privileges that only belong to them and which cannot be used by losers. One housemate from the losing team will leave the game. Big Brother watches over the rivalry of both teams and doesn't tolerate any compromises or arrangements. Big Brother house was divided into two parts. The first is the residential part, where the decor and equipment have changed. One bedroom belongs to the losers and the other to the winners. The second part is a battlefield surrounded by barbed wire with an area of 200 square meters, which includes obstacles, towers and pits inhabited by rats.

Andrzej Sołtysik and Martyna Wojciechowska host the main show.

Finally, Piotr Borucki walked out as the winner. The prize for him is 500.000 PLN.

Housemates

Nominations Table 

 Housemates on the Red team
 Housemates on the Blue team

Notes
  The  Red Team won the task, meaning only members of the  Blue Team could be nominated for eviction. Agnieszka K and Wojciech decided not to nominate.
  Ireneusz was automatically nominated for breaking the rules.
  On day 21 Agnieszka K and Wojciech were automatically nominated for eviction since Wojciech walked on day 22 the eviction was canceled.
  Agnieszka K. was automatically nominated due to her not nominating in Round 1.
  Anna was automatically nominated for refusing to nominate a second person.
  Anna was kicked out on day 45 for refusing to nominate for the second time.
  Piotr moved to the  Red Team to even up the numbers.
  Housemates had to vote for which new Housemate should be evicted.
  Katarzyna J. initially refused to nominate, she changed her mind when Big Brother said she would be ejected if she didn't. Arkadiusz refused to nominate, Big Brother said he would be ejected if he didn't. He was given another chance to nominate a few days later but again refused. Big Brother asked the public if Arkadiusz should be given another chance to nominate or if he should be ejected, the public decided to let Arkadiusz stay in the house and gave him one more chance to nominate, he finally agreed to nominate.
 The public was voting for who they wanted to win instead of who they wanted to evict.

References

External links 
 Official site

03
2002 Polish television seasons